The Battle of Zhizhi (郅支之戰) was fought in 36 BC between the Han Dynasty and the Xiongnu chieftain Zhizhi Chanyu. Zhizhi was defeated and killed. The battle was probably fought near Taraz on the Talas River in eastern Kazakhstan, which makes it one of the westernmost points reached by a Chinese army. The Battle of Talas in 751 AD was fought in the same area.

Background
In 56 BC Zhizhi revolted against his brother. As his brother grew more powerful, Zhizhi retreated westward. About 44 BC he made a close alliance with the Kangju near Lake Balkhash. Later he quarrelled with the Kangju, killed several hundred of them and forced them to build him a fortress. The fort required 500 men and two years to build. It was probably located near Taraz.

Battle

Assembly and march of Han forces
At approximately 36 BC, the governor of the Western Regions was Gan Yanshou. His deputy commander, Chen Tang, claimed that Zhizhi was planning to build up a great empire and proposed a pre-emptive attack. Gan Yanshou objected; but he soon fell ill, and while he was incapacitated Chen Tang forged an edict in Yanshou's name and mobilized the army. Gan Yanshou was forced to yield. All this was done without the Emperor's permission. An army of 40,000 Han and Hu troops (''Hu" here is a loose term for non-Chinese) assembled. It marched west on both sides of the Tarim Basin, reunited near Kashgar, and moved across Kangju territory reaching the western shore of Lake Balkhash. At this point a party of several thousand Kangju cavalrymen, returning from a raid on Wusun, stumbled onto the rear of the Chinese army, attacked it, and made off with a large quantity of food and weapons. Chen Tang sent his Hu troops back and defeated the Kangju, killing 460 of them and freeing 470 Wusun captives.

Battle at Zhizhi's Fortress
Several Kangju nobles defected to the Chinese and provided information and guides. The Chinese encamped about 30 li from Zhizhi's fortress and the two sides exchanged rather hypocritical messages. They then moved to within three li of Zhizhi and fortified themselves. The Xiongnu sent out several hundred cavalry and infantry, but they were driven back into the fort. The Chinese followed and attacked the fort and managed to burn part of the wall. That night several hundred Xiongnu horsemen tried to escape but all were killed. Zhizhi himself thought of escape but decided to remain because he knew that he had too many enemies in the surrounding country, and fighting continued. Zhizhi's queen and concubines shot arrows from the ramparts. Zhizhi was wounded in the nose by an arrow.

Shortly after midnight the outer walls were breached and the Xiongnu retreated to the inner citadel. At this point several thousand Kangju horsemen appeared and attacked the Chinese in the darkness but were unable to accomplish anything. When dawn broke parts of the inner citadel were on fire. The Chinese piled dirt on the citadel walls and clambered into the citadel. Zhizhi and a hundred or so warriors retreated into the palace. The palace was set on fire and attacked from all directions and Zhizhi was mortally wounded.

Aftermath

1,518 Xiongnu died, including Zhizhi and Zhizhi's wives. 145 were captured and well over 1,000 surrendered. The soldiers were allowed to keep their booty and the surrendered Xiongnu were distributed to the fifteen kingdoms that participated in the battle. The following spring Gan Yanshou and Chen Tang arrived at Chang'an and presented Emperor Yuan of Han with Zhizhi's severed head. It was displayed on the city wall for ten days and then buried. Zhizhi was the only Xiongnu Chanyu killed by the Chinese.

Hypothetical Sino-Roman contact
A hypothesis by the Sinologist Homer H. Dubs, according to which Roman legionaries clashed with Han troops during the battle and were resettled afterwards in a Chinese village named Liqian, has been rejected by modern historians and geneticists on the grounds of a critical appraisal of the ancient sources and recent DNA testings of the village people. However, this hypothesis has been supported by Lev Gumilev.

A new hypothesis (Greek Hoplites in an Ancient Chinese Siege, Journal of Asian History) from 2011 by Dr Christopher Anthony Matthew from the Australian Catholic University suggests that these strange warriors were not Roman legionaries, but Hoplites from the Kingdom of Fergana also known as Alexandria Exchate or Dayaun which was one of the successor states of Alexander the Great's Empire.

Footnotes

References
Ban Gu et al., Hanshu. Beijing: Zhonghua Shuju, 1962. 
Sima Guang, comp. Zizhi Tongjian. Beijing: Zhonghua Shuju, 1956. 
David Wilkinson (1999) "Power polarity in the Far Eastern World System," Journal of World-Systems Research, Vol V, 3, 1999, 501-617
Yap, Joseph P. (2009). Wars With The Xiongnu, A Translation from Zizhi tongjian. AuthorHouse, Bloomington, Indiana, U.S.A. .

36 BC
Zhizhi 36 BC
Zhizhi
1st century BC in China
History of Kazakhstan
Zhizhi
1st-century BC battles